Ryan Cook (born April 3, 1981) is a singer/songwriter from Nova Scotia, Canada. He has released four studio albums, three of which have been nominated for the Music Nova Scotia Awards "Album of the Year".

Early life

Cook grew up on a dairy farm in Yarmouth County, Nova Scotia, the eldest of four children. In high school Cook wrote and sang for local punk rock and heavy metal garage bands. He graduated from Yarmouth Consolidated Memorial High School in 2000. While in college, he worked part-time at a retirement home and began taking requests to perform traditional country music. He developed a passion for the genre which led him to pursue a career in folk and country music.

2008–2009: Hot Times

In 2008, Cook recorded with his then touring band, Sunny Acres, and released his debut LP Hot Times. The record won a Music Nova Scotia Country/Bluegrass Recording of the Year award, was nominated for an East Coast Music award, and named the eighth Best Canadian Country Album of 2008 by  Country Music News.

2009–2011: Peaks and Valleys

In 2009, while performing at the CMA Music Festival in Nashville, Tennessee, Cook met John Walker, a producer for Music City Roots. The two established a partnership which brought many Nashville musicians together to record at Quad Studios. The album features Lloyd Green, Andy Leftwich, Guthrie Trapp, Bruce Bouton, and Alison Brown.  The album received and won award nominations including Best Canadian Country Album of 2010 by Country Music News (Canada) beating some of Canada's most recognized country artists such as Gord Bamford, Johnny Reid, Deric Ruttan, Carolyn Dawn Johnson, and Dean Brody.

2011-2014:  Wrestling with Demons, solo career

In 2011 Cook began performing as a solo entertainer and toured as the opening act for country music artists such as Sammy Kershaw, Travis Tritt, Dwight Yoakam, and Rosanne Cash. In 2013 Cook released a third album, Wrestling with Demons, which featured former members of Hank Snow's touring band The Rainbow Ranch Boys. The album was produced in Canada and also featured Canadian guitarist/fiddler J. P. Cormier. Wrestling with Demons was nominated at the ECMA and Music Nova Scotia awards in 2013 and won an award for Country Album of the Year.

2017:  Having A Great Time

On November 3, 2017 Cook released this fourth studio album, Having A Great Time, with award-winning producer Charles Austin (Rita MacNeil, Jerry Granelli, Joel Plaskett) at New Scotland Yard in Dartmouth, Nova Scotia.

Discography

Studio albums

Awards

Music Nova Scotia Awards
Music Nova Scotia Awards is an annual awards ceremony established in 1997 as part of the Molson Canadian Nova Scotia Music Week.

|-
|rowspan="2" align="center"| 2007 || rowspan="2"| Sunny Acres EP || New Artist/Group Recording|| 
|-
||Country/Bluegrass Recording|| 
|-
|rowspan="2" align="center"| 2008 || rowspan="2"| Hot Times LP || New Artist/Group Recording|| 
|-
||Country/Bluegrass Recording|| 
|-
|rowspan="2" align="center"| 2009 || rowspan="2"| Hot Times LP || Digital Artist|| 
|-
||Male Artist|| 
|-
|rowspan="3" align="center"| 2011 || rowspan="3"| Peaks & Valleys LP || Album|| 
|-
||Male Artist|| 
|-
||Country/Bluegrass Recording|| 
|-
|rowspan="1" align="center"| 2011 || rowspan="1"|Gaspereau Valley|| SOCAN Song of the Year|| 
|-
|rowspan="1" align="center"| 2013 || rowspan="1"|Ryan Cook|| Entertainer of the Year|| 
|-
|rowspan="2" align="center"| 2013 || rowspan="2"| Wrestling with Demons || Album|| 
|-
||Country/Bluegrass Recording|| 
|-
|rowspan="1" align="center"| 2018 || rowspan="1"| Having A Great Time || Country Recording|| 
|-

East Coast Music Awards
The East Coast Music Association is a non-profit association that hosts an annual awards ceremony based in Atlantic Canada for music appreciation on the East Coast of Canada.

|-
|rowspan="1" align="center"| 2009 || rowspan="1"| Hot Times LP || Country Recording|| 
|-
|rowspan="3" align="center"| 2011|| rowspan="3"| Peaks & Valleys LP || Country Recording|| 
|-
||Rising Artist|| 
|-
||Digital Artist|| 
|-
|rowspan="1" align="center"| 2013|| rowspan="1"| Wrestling with Demons LP || Country Recording|| 
|-
|rowspan="1" align="center"| 2019|| rowspan="1"| Having a Great Time LP || Country Recording|| 
|-

Other awards
2011 Canadian Country Album of the year, Peaks & Valleys - Country Music News

References

External links
 

1981 births
Canadian country singer-songwriters
Canadian male singer-songwriters
Living people
Musicians from Nova Scotia
People from Yarmouth, Nova Scotia
21st-century Canadian male singers